The StorySLAM is a live storytelling competition in the vein of poetry slams organized by The Moth, a non-profit literary society from New York City, since 2001. Storytellers (slammers) have 5 minutes each to tell a story, based on a theme chosen for the event. No notes are allowed: stories must be told and not read. The events, held in cities around the United States, now also include a competition; participants are judged by teams of audience members. The organization also holds a biannual Grand Slam competition.

Notables performing at StorySLAMs include Moby, Lily Taylor, and Frank McCourt.

Locations
* United States
 Ann Arbor, Michigan
Asheville, North Carolina
Boston, Massachusetts 
Burlington, Vermont
Washington, D.C.
 Chicago, Illinois
 Denver, Colorado
 Detroit, Michigan
 Houston, Texas
 Los Angeles, California
 Louisville, Kentucky
 Madison, Wisconsin
 Miami, Florida
 Milwaukee, Wisconsin
New Orleans, Louisiana
New York City, New York
Philadelphia, Pennsylvania
Pittsburgh, Pennsylvania
Portland, Oregon
San Francisco, California
Seattle, Washington
Twin Cities, Minnesota
International:
Bristol, England
Dublin, Ireland
London, England
Melbourne, Australia
Sydney, Australia

References

Storytelling events